Polystylus may refer to:
 Polystylus (place), an ancient city in the Roman province of Macedonia
 Phalaenopsis, an orchid also called Polystylus Hasselt ex Hassk